Bilborough Sixth Form College is a sixth-form college in Nottingham, England. The college has students from across the conurbation. A third of its students come from Nottingham, another third from the surrounding county of Nottinghamshire, and a final third from Derbyshire. The majority of students will study at the college for two years.

History
Opened in 1957 as Bilborough Grammar School, the school became a sixth-form college in 1975 when Nottingham's education system became comprehensive. The college has grown from 635 students to 1600 full-time students enrolled to be attending the college in September 2016.

The new accommodations opened officially on 21 July, 2006. The new building is divided into 3 blocks (A, B, and C), and 4 floors (0-3). The new building has a photographic lab, lecture theatre, theatre, shop, refectory, large art rooms, library, and "soundproof" music rooms. The development, designed by CPMG Architects, has already won a design award from the local civic society, and has more recently received the Lord Mayor of Nottingham's Award for Urban Design.

Curriculum
The curriculum is based on A-level provision with the option for some BTEC qualifications. The college offers students the opportunity to study a wide variety of subjects.

A Level

BTEC 
The college offers BTEC qualifications across the following areas:
 Performing Arts
 Information Technology
 Creative Digital Media Production
 Business
 Sport
 Applied Science

International Baccalaureate
The International Baccalaureate was taught at the college from 2009 to 2016 and celebrated some of the best national results, including three 40+ scores.

Academic performance
Bilborough College students have had A-level pass rates exceeding 98% since 2004, with 27 of the subjects on offer reaching pass rates of 100%. Twenty-five per cent of entries achieved A*- A, 3% more than the previous year, while over 50% achieved grades A*-B.

The most recent Ofsted inspection, in 2020, found the college rated as “good” in all categories by inspectors. The college was also rated good in the previous inspection in 2016.

Alumni
 Rosie Barnes, former SDP MP
Tom Blyth, actor
Alice Levine, DJ and presenter
Molly Windsor, Actress and winner of the 2018 BAFTA TV Award for Best Actress
Nadia Whittome, British Labour Politician, MP for Nottingham East since 2019

References

External links
 Bilborough College Website
 £20.8m development
 Aluminium use in building
 Ofsted Report
 Former grammar school (BGS)

Educational institutions established in 1957
Sixth form colleges in Nottinghamshire
1957 establishments in England